Brabant-le-Roi is a commune in the Meuse department in Grand Est in northeastern France. The priest and Encyclopédiste Charles Millot died in Brabant-le-Roi 9 June 1769.

Geography
The village lies in the southern part of the commune on the right bank of the Nausonce, a tributary of the Chée, which forms part of the commune's western border.

Population

See also
Communes of the Meuse department

References

Communes of Meuse (department)